Austria competed at the 2018 Winter Olympics in Pyeongchang, South Korea, from 9 to 25 February 2018, with 105 competitors in 12 sports. They won 14 medals in total: five gold, three silver and six bronze; ranking 10th in the medal table.

Medalists 

| width="78%" align="left" valign="top" |

| width="22%" align="left" valign="top" |

On 22 January 2018, alpine skier Anna Veith was named as the country's flag bearer during the opening ceremony. During the announcement it was also announced the Austrian team would be composed of 105 athletes (65 men and 40 women) competing in 12 sports.

Competitors 
The following is the list of number of competitors participating in the delegation per sport.

Alpine skiing

Men

Women

Mixed

Biathlon 

Based on their Nations Cup rankings in the 2016–17 Biathlon World Cup, Austria has qualified 6 men and 5 women. However, they forfeited 2 female quota.

Men

Women

Mixed

Bobsleigh 

Based on their rankings in the 2017–18 Bobsleigh World Cup, Austria has qualified 6 sleds.

Men

Women

* – Denotes the driver of each sled

Cross-country skiing 

Austria has qualified 4 men and 3 women.

Distance
Men

Women

Sprint

Figure skating 

Austria qualified one entry in pairs figure skating through the 2017 CS Nebelhorn Trophy. The pair was announced on December 18, 2017.

Freestyle skiing 

Austria has qualified 7 men and 5 women.

Halfpipe

Moguls

Ski cross

Slopestyle

Luge 

Based on the results from the World Cups during the 2017–18 Luge World Cup season, Austria qualified 8 sleds.

Gleirscher's unexpected win in the men's individual luge event was the first win in the event for an Austrian since the 1968 Olympics.
Men

Women

Mixed team relay

Nordic combined 

Austria has qualified 5 men:

Skeleton 

Based on the world rankings, Austria qualified 3 sleds, but rejected one male quota.

Ski jumping 

Austria has qualified 5 men and 3 women:

Men

Women

Snowboarding 

Austria has qualified 9 men and 5 women:
Freestyle

Qualification Legend: QF – Qualify directly to final; QS – Qualify to semifinal

Parallel

Snowboard cross

Qualification legend: FA-Qualify to medal round; FB- Qualify to consolation round

Speed skating

Austria earned the following quotas at the conclusion of the four World Cup's used for qualification.

Individual

Mass start

References

Nations at the 2018 Winter Olympics
2018
Winter Olympics